Papilio pilumnus, the three-tailed tiger swallowtail, is a species of swallowtail butterfly from the genus Papilio that is found in Texas, Mexico and Guatemala.  Papilio xuthus and Papilio appalachiensis are also of the same genus.

The larvae feed on the leaves of Litsea species.

References

External links
Butterflycorner Images from Naturhistorisches Museum Wien

pilumnus
Butterflies described in 1836
Papilionidae of South America
Taxa named by Jean Baptiste Boisduval